The Flirts were a project concept group formed by Bobby "O" Orlando to further front his performances as an artist, musician and songwriter. The group consisted of  Orlando and featured an ever revolving roster of female session singers and models. Under The Flirts name, Orlando churned out hits "Passion", "Danger", "Helpless" and "Jukebox (Don't Put Another Dime)".

Concept and first chart success
Orlando conceived the idea for the Flirts, wrote the songs, played the instruments, and produced the tracks. He then auditioned girls to be the faces of the group. Orlando often called in the services of professional session singers to sing the female vocals for the tracks because most of the performers were trained as dancers, models or actresses. The Flirts went through numerous lineup changes and with every album release and tour, some girls left while others stayed. Orlando released six studio albums under The Flirts name from 1982–1992 and numerous singles. 

"Jukebox" received significant airplay on MTV in 1982. The song rose to number 28 on the Billboard US Dance Chart. The follow-up single "Passion" peaked the same year at number 21, and became a huge success in Europe, reaching number 22 in the Netherlands and number 4 in Germany.  
 
"Helpless (You Took My Love)" peaked at number 12 on the Billboard US Dance Chart, and reached number 13 on the German Top 75. Members of The Flirts performed in the German feature film .

In 1985, "You and Me", which Orlando co-wrote with influential hip hop producer Clifton "Jiggs" Chase, topped the US dance chart.

Members 
 Bobby Orlando (artist, producer, musician, songwriter)

1982 "10C a Dance" era: 
 Andrea Del Conte 
 Sandra D'Key 
 Hope Rayman 
 Holly Kerr 
 Rebecca Sullivan 
1983 "Born To Flirt" era: 
 Pamela Orlando 
 Linda Jo Rizzo 
 Rebeka Storm 
1984 "Made In America" era:
 Christina Criscione 
 Debby Gaynor 
 Christie Angelica Muhaw 
1985 "Blondes, Brunettes & Redheads" era:
 Christina Criscione 
 Debby Gaynor 
 Tricia Wygal 
1986 "Questions Of The Heart" era:
 Christina Criscione 
 Geri McKeon 
 Tricia Wygal 

Plus many session singers who sang lead and background vocals on tracks that were released under the name The Flirts.

Discography

Albums

Studio albums

Live albums

Compilation albums

Singles

Featured tracks on compilations
 "Danger" - Disco Discharge: Pink Pounders (2010)
 "Passion" - Disco Discharge: Gay Disco & Hi-NRG (2009)
 "Passion" - Grand 12 Inches 4 (2007, Sony)
 "Helpless (You Took My Love)" - I Love Bobby O (2006)
 "Passion" - Back to Mine: Pet Shop Boys (2005)
 "Passion" - I Love Disco Energy (2003)

See also
List of number-one dance hits (United States)
List of artists who reached number one on the US Dance chart

References

External links
The Flirts on Allmusic

American dance girl groups
American dance music groups
American hi-NRG groups